Epitophysis is a genus of beetles in the family Cerambycidae, and the only species in the genus is Epitophysis substriata. It was described by Gressitt and Rondon in 1970.

References

Dorcasominae
Beetles described in 1970
Monotypic Cerambycidae genera